Lugbara Kari (which can be translated as "House of Lugbara") refers to the official traditional and cultural institution of all Lugbara people on Earth and headed by the Agofe.

History
Although cultural institutions were abolished in 1967, the 1995 Constitution of Uganda helped revive them. Lugbara Kari started rebuilding by establishing interim county chiefs answerable to the Agofe. The 3rd Agofe of Lugbara Kari is educationist Jason Avutia who will be replaced through elections in 2021 after his 94th birthday.

Structure
Administratively, Lugbara Kari has county chiefs who answer to the elected Paramount Chief; each chief (from Ayivu, Maracha, Terego, Vurra, Aringa, Madi, Kebu, etc) is a potential future agofe. The Lugbara have no opi [Translated from Lugbara: king]. Functions and objectives of Lugbara Kari include enhancing cooperation among Lugbara and promoting heritage plus the Lugbara language. With the motto "MUNGU le Lugbara ambo [GOD loves the Lugbara very much]", Lugbara Kari uses a leopard as an emblem. It's also the identity of the Kari's capital.

See also
 Agofe
 Chiefdom

References

Lugbara
Ugandan culture